Farewell Continental is the first extended-play release by American alternative-rock band Farewell Continental, released on May 25, 2009, by Paper + Plastick.

Track listing
"Depend on Me" 4:08
"We Are Cosmonaut" 2:25
"Do You Wanna Tangle?" 4:19
"One Last Lunge of the Big Time Washed-Up" 2:09

Personnel

Justin Pierre vocals, guitar
Kari Gray vocals, keyboards
Thomas Rehbein guitar
Jim Adolphson bass
Josh McKay drums

See also

 2009 in music

References

External links
 
 

2009 EPs
2009 in American music
Farewell Continental albums
Alternative rock EPs
EPs by American artists